Slib is a Czech novel, written by Jiří Kratochvil. It was first published in 2009.

2009 Czech novels
Novels set in the 1950s